The PFAM Player of the Month is an association football award that recognises the best Malaysian League player each month of the season.
The player nominated in the month will be selected by a panel comprising representatives from PFAM, asiana.my and media practitioners. Assessment will be made by the Nomination Committee PFAM Player of the Month Award – asiana.my comprising practitioners experienced sports media. Among the matters considered by the Nomination Committee is the player's performance during the month, the goal scored and assists. They are free to choose any player from the Premier League who they felt deserved to receive the award. Votes will be made through PFAM official website which is [www.pfam.my.] The voters can vote via desktop, laptop, smartphone, or tablet and can use all types of browsers. Anyone can vote for the candidates that was chosenfor the award. PFAM will include a list of nominations to the site for each month.

Organised by Professional Footballers Association of Malaysia, the Player of the Month award was introduced in May 2015, Wan Zaharulnizam Zakaria is the first winner for this award. The winner is picked via a votes in the PFAM official websites by the fan and will also be announced on their official websites. The most recent winner is Kelantan FA player, Mohammed Ghaddar for April 2017.

Prize
In 2015, the winner will received a trophy and picture contributed by All Sport Images and News Agency (asiana.my) and RM500 by MVP Sports Agency.

In 2016, MVP Sports Agency has added RM1000 into the money prize and making the money prize worth RM1500 along with a trophy and picture

Selection panel

Fariz Fikri Zolkarnain from MVP Sport Agency Sdn Bhd.
Saiyed Ismail Saiyed Hussin, sports journalist) from Saiyed Ismail Saiyed Hussin TV3
Vijhay Vick, journalist from FourFourTwo (Malaysian edition)
Aziman Rosdi, sport journalist from Harian Metro
Ahmad Fazli, sport journalist from Kosmo!
Ahmad Muzammil, chief editor from Semuanya BOLA

Winners

Candidates

Voting percentage

Multiple winners
The below table lists those who have won on more than one occasion.

Awards won by position

Awards won by nationality

Awards won by club

References

Association football trophies and awards
Football in Malaysia

External links
 PFAM-PLAYER OF THE MONTH SUPER LEAGUE